Black Flame may refer to:

 Black Flame (album), 2018 studio album by British metalcore band Bury Tomorrow
 Black Flame (band), Italian black metal band
 Black Flame (book), 2009 book on the global history of anarchism by Lucien van der Walt and Michael Schmidt
 Black Flame (publisher), science fiction, fantasy, and horror cult fiction publisher, an imprint of BL Publishing and Games Workshop

See also 
 The Black Flame (disambiguation)